Samuel 'Sam' Alexander Westaway (born 29 July 1992) is an English former first-class cricketer.

Westaway was born at Welwyn Garden City in July 1992. He was educated at Dr Challoner's Grammar School, before going up to Pembroke College, Oxford. While studying at Oxford, he played first-class cricket for Oxford University between 2011–16, making five appearances in The University Match against Cambridge University. Playing as a wicket-keeper, he scored 174 runs in his five matches at an average of 29.00 and a high score of 69 not out. Behind the stumps he took 24 catches.

References

External links

1992 births
Living people
People from Welwyn Garden City
People educated at Dr Challoner's Grammar School
Alumni of Pembroke College, Oxford
English cricketers
Oxford University cricketers